John F. Walvoord (May 1, 1910 – December 20, 2002) was a Christian theologian, pastor, and president of Dallas Theological Seminary from 1952 to 1986. He was the author of over 30 books, focusing primarily on eschatology and theology including The Rapture Question, and was co-editor of The Bible Knowledge Commentary with Roy B. Zuck. He earned AB and DD degrees from Wheaton College, an AM degree from Texas Christian University in philosophy, a Th.B., Th.M., and Th.D. in Systematic Theology from Dallas Theological Seminary, and a Litt.D. from Liberty Baptist Seminary.

History
Walvoord was brought up in a Christian home, but had little interest in the faith until he was fifteen, when his family moved to Racine after his father accepted a position as superintendent of the junior high. They joined the Union Gospel Tabernacle where he committed his life to Christ after attending a Bible study on Galatians.

After continuing his education at Wheaton College, Walvoord went on to Texas Christian University and Dallas Theological Seminary where he completed his Th.D. in 1936. Seminary president and mentor Lewis Sperry Chafer appointed Walvoord to the position of registrar. During his tenure, he also taught systematic theology at the seminary, and pastored the Rosen Heights Baptist Church in Fort Worth. Walvoord became more involved in the administration of the school, serving as Chafer's assistant and secretary to the faculty, and upon Chafer's death in 1952, became the seminary's second president where he served until his retirement in 1986.

In addition to his responsibilities at the seminary, Walvoord earned a reputation as one of the most influential dispensational theologians of the 20th century and played a prominent role in advocating a rapture of Christians from the earth prior to a time of great tribulation, followed by a literal thousand-year millennial reign of Christ, and a renewed focus of God on the nation of Israel (which he associated with modern day Jews) as distinct from the church. As part of his Dispensationalist theology, he claimed there was prophetic Biblical justification for the restoration of a Jewish state in Palestine. Stephen Sizer; an Anglican priest who gained a Masters in Theology from Oxford University and is a prominent critic of Christian Zionism; lists Walvoord as one of the "leading dispensationalists who are also overtly Zionist" including also Charles Ryrie, Dwight Pentecost, Eric Sauer, Charles Dyer and Hal Lindsey. All associated with the Dallas Theological Seminary.

Selected publications
 The Revelation of Jesus Christ, John Walvoord, Moody Publishers (1966), 
 Daniel: The Key to Prophetic Revelation, John Walvoord, Moody Publishers (1971), 
Armageddon, Oil and the Middle East Crisis, Zondervan. (1974, rev. ed. 1976 and 1990), 
 Jesus Christ Our Lord, John F Walvoord, Moody Publishers (1974), 
 Major Bible Themes (with Lewis Sperry Chafer) (1974)
 The Blessed Hope and the Tribulation: A Historical and Biblical Study of Posttribulationism (1976)
 The Rapture Question (1979)
 The Millennial Kingdom (1983)
 The Bible Knowledge Commentary, (with Roy B. Zuck), Cook Communications (1989), 
 The Holy Spirit: A Comprehensive Study of the Person and Work of the Holy Spirit (1991)
 (contributor) Five Views on Sanctification  (1996)
 (contributor) Four Views on Hell, Zondervan Corp. (1996), 
 Matthew: Thy Kingdom Come, The Moody Bible Institute of Chicago (1974), 
 The Final Drama: Fourteen Keys to Understanding the Prophetic Scriptures, Kregel Publications (1998), 
 Every Prophecy of the Bible, Cook Communications (1999), 
 The Church in Prophecy: Exploring God's Purpose for the Present Age, Kregel Publications (1999), 
 The Power of Praying Together: Experiencing Christ Actively in Charge, (with Oliver W. Price) Kregel Publications (1999), 
 Major Bible Prophecies, Zondervan Corp. (1999), 
 Blessed Hope, (Autobiography with Mal Couch), AMG Publishers (2001), 
 Prophecy in the New Millennium, Kregel Publications (2001),

References

Audio programs
 Harold Camping (Amillennialism) vs. John Walvoord (Premillennialism) – 1980 debate MP3

1910 births
2002 deaths
20th-century American clergy
American Christian theologians
American Christian Zionists
American Presbyterian ministers
Christian writers about eschatology
Dallas Theological Seminary alumni
Dallas Theological Seminary faculty
Texas Christian University alumni
Wheaton College (Illinois) alumni